The Jaén Tramway (Spanish: Tranvía de Jaén) is a tramway system constructed in the city of Jaén, Spain (Andalusia), which was built in 2009–2011 but operated only very briefly for passenger service, never opened for full regular service, and now might never open.

Work began in 2009, and five low-floor Alstom Citadis trams, model 302, were acquired.  The completed line was ceremonially inaugurated on 2 May 2011, and limited free "trial service" began on 3 May 2011. However, that service operated for only a little more than two weeks and was then suspended, "due to a political dispute about withdrawal of competing bus services" and the need to secure funds to pay for the line's operation.

The new line continued to be "mothballed" through 2012, and in early 2013 the city government – which owns the system – announced plans to offer the entire system (line and cars) for sale at auction, because it lacked the money to operate it.  A one-year financial audit in 2012 found that the line would not generate nearly as much revenue as had originally been forecast, and the resultant need for a much larger operating subsidy exceeded the city's means.  The city hopes to find a private company willing to operate the line, but there is a possibility the system will be dismantled. As at January 2017, the line was still not operating.

In December 2021 it was announced that 4.6 million euro from the Next Generation EU fund would be used to finance the final contracts to get the tram system running.

The  line was built fully at-grade (entirely on the surface), with track and station platforms separated from traffic.  Intersections are the only contact points with motor vehicular traffic.

References

External links 
 Tranvía de Jaén (Jaén Tramway) 

Jaén, Spain
Tram transport in Spain
Jaén
Cancelled projects in Spain